Drosera stenopetala is an insectivorous, rosette-forming perennial sub-alpine or alpine herb. The specific epithet means "with narrow petals", which is somewhat misleading given that the petals of this plant are fairly wide. A species of sundew, it is unique within its genus in being endemic to New Zealand. It is one of New Zealand's two alpine species of Drosera, the other being Drosera arcturi. Characteristic features include involute (inwardly curved) petioles and upright leaves. Its range extends from the Ruahine and Tararua Ranges in the north down the Southern Alps to Stewart Island. It is also found on the Auckland Islands and Campbell Island.

See also
Carnivorous plants of New Zealand

References

External links
 NZ Carnivorous plants society website page about this species 
 NZ Plant Conservation network page about this species

Carnivorous plants of New Zealand
stenopetala
Taxa named by Joseph Dalton Hooker